Antler is a Singapore-based business incubator and startup accelerator founded in 2017.

Background 
In 2017, Magnus Grimeland founded Antler in Singapore. Grimeland, a graduate of Harvard College previously worked at McKinsey & Company and then worked with Rocket Internet to co-found Zalora Group. Later on, Zalora Group became part of Global Fashion Group where Grimeland became its COO. During his time there he noticed how technology workers were in jobs that weren't fully utilizing their talents and left them to start their own businesses.Grimeland founded Antler to help such workers.

Antler runs a combined incubator and accelerator program that lasts for several months and has two phases. The first phase helps entrepreneurs find co-founders and teams to help develop their business idea. The second phase, Antler selects a number of teams and works with them to build their product towards a public pitch event or demo day. The first program was launched in Singapore in 2018 where 1,400 people applied, 62 were accepted and at the end, 13 companies were selected. In 2020, Antler and National University of Singapore launched a part-time version of the program for participants who are currently working.

While Antler is focused on investing in companies during their early stage phase, it 2021 it has stated has considering extending to later stages, funding companies up to Series C.

As of May 2022, Antler has invested in over 450 startup companies. One in eight of Antler's investments have failed and it currently has not produced a Unicorn or a investment exit of significant scale.

Investors of Antler include individual such as Eduardo Saverin and  Christen Sveaas as well as institutions such as Canica, Credit Saison, International Finance Corporation, Schroders, Vækstfonden and Phoenix Group.

Antler has offices in Asia-Pacific, Europe and North America. Offices were opened in Nairobi, Kenya and in Sao Paulo, Brazil in 2019 and 2022 respectively.

References

External links
 

Singaporean companies established in 2017
Financial services companies established in 2017
Investment management companies of Singapore
Venture capital firms of Singapore
Startup accelerators